Marine Fighting Squadron 132 (VMF-132) was a fighter squadron in the United States Marine Corps.  The squadron, also known as “The Crying Red Asses”, fought in World War II as a dive bomber unit during the Battle of Guadalcanal as part of the Cactus Air Force and later fought in the Central Solomon Islands.  The squadron was decommissioned shortly after the end of the war but was reactivated in the Marine Air Reserve flying out of Floyd Bennett Field in  Brooklyn, New York.  They were again decommissioned sometime after 1958.

History
Marine Bombing Squadron 6 (VB-6M) was formed in San Diego, California in 1932.  They were deactivated shortly thereafter in 1933, only to reactivate again in January 1935.  The squadron was redesignated as Marine Bombing Squadron 1 (VMB-1) on 1 July 1937.  The squadron was again redesignated as Marine Scout Bombing Squadron 132 (VMSB-132) on 1 July 1941.  At the outbreak of World War II, the squadron, under the command of Major A.D. Cooley, and its 19 Douglas SBD-1 Dauntless dive bombers were stationed at Marine Corps Air Station Quantico, Virginia as part of Marine Aircraft Group 11.

VMSB-132 left the United States on 13 October 1942 from San Diego aboard the Lurline.  At the time of their departure the squadron consisted of 27 officers, 245 enlisted men and a few attached Navy personnel. They landed in Nouméa, New Caledonia on 28 October. On 30 October 1942, VMSB-132, under the command of Major Louis Robertshaw, landed at Henderson Field, Guadalcanal.  Upon arrival, they became part of the Cactus Air Force and fought during the Battle of Guadalcanal until December 1942 when they were relieved by VMSB-233.  The squadron’s pilots and gunners left the island on 24 December 1942 and arrived in Sydney, Australia for leave on New Year’s Eve.   After resting, reorganizing, and retraining, they then moved to Espiritu Santo where they were met by their ground echelon in January 1943. During this time, they became part of the Strike Command of the 13th Air Force, responsible for attacking nearby enemy bases and shipping and giving what was then considered close support to front-line units. The squadron returned to Guadalcanal in June 1943 and flew missions from there until their return to the States on 26 October 1943.

Early in the summer of 1944, the squadron was reorganized and in training at Marine Corps Air Station El Toro as part of Marine Base Defense Air Group 41. On 14 October 1944, the squadron was once again redesignated, this time as Marine Torpedo Bombing Squadron 132 (VMTB-132). They received their first Grumman TBF Avengers in November of that year.  The squadron training at Marine Corps Air Station Mojave, California from 15 December 1944 until January 16, 1945.  They remained in training until they embarked on board the USS Cape Gloucester on 21 May 1945.   They arrived in Leyte on 29 June 1945 and operated in the East China Sea during July and August 1945.

Following the war, the squadron moved to Marine Corps Air Station Ewa, Hawaii where they were decommissioned on 9 November 1945.

Awards

Unit
  Presidential Unit Citation — Guadalcanal/Tulagi (August 7 – December 9, 1942)

Notable Former Members
 Major Joseph Sailer Jr. - awarded the Navy Cross for his actions during the Battle of Guadalcanal from 10–15 November 1942 

 Second Lieutenant Frank Christen - was a U.S. Marine dive bomber pilot who on 16 December 1942, participated in a night strike against a Japanese destroyer off New Georgia during the Battle of Guadalcanal. Lt. Christen made the initial run on the destroyer and illuminated it with flares. Lt. Christen’s section leader, Lt. Jackson Simpson, then rolled in on the ship and scored a direct hit. Christen followed a moment later and was last seen entering his dive. This was the last time Lt. Christen’s SBD was ever seen as it vanished into night. Lt. Frank Christen and his radioman/gunner, PFC Glenn Shattuck were reported missing in action shortly thereafter and were declared dead one year later on 17 December 1943. According to a translated Japanese report captured in Manchuria in May of 1943, Lt. Christen had been interrogated at Rabaul and was reported to be a prisoner of war. Frank died while in captivity and was posthumously awarded the  Distinguished Flying Cross and the Purple Heart.

See also

 United States Marine Corps Aviation
 List of decommissioned United States Marine Corps aircraft squadrons
 List of active United States Marine Corps aircraft squadrons

Citations

References

Bibliography

Web

Fighting132
Inactive units of the United States Marine Corps